Henderson Pyramid is a pointed, mostly ice-covered mountain,  high, located  south-southwest of Ugolini Peak on the west side of the Royal Society Range in Victoria Land, Antarctica. It was mapped by the United States Geological Survey (USGS) from surveys and U.S. Navy aerial photographs, 1956–61, and was named by the Advisory Committee on Antarctic Names in 1994 after Thomas E. Henderson, a USGS cartographer. Henderson was a field team member on the Ellsworth Mountains Geodetic Control Project, 1979–80; leader of the USGS northern Victoria Land Geodetic Team, 1981–82; and of the USGS satellite surveying team at South Pole Station in the winter party of 1982.

References

Mountains of Victoria Land
Scott Coast